20th SFBAFCC Awards
January 10, 2022

Best Picture:
The Power of the Dog

Best Animated Feature:
Encanto

Best Documentary Feature:
Summer of Soul (...Or, When the Revolution Could Not Be Televised)

Best Foreign Language Film:
Drive My Car

The 20th San Francisco Bay Area Film Critics Circle Awards, honoring the best in film for 2021, were given on January 10, 2022. The nominations were announced on January 7, 2022, with The Power of the Dog leading the nominations with nine. The film also received the most awards, with eight wins, including Best Picture.

Winners and nominees

These are the nominees for the 20th SFFCC Awards. Winners are listed at the top of each list:

Special awards

Special Citation for Independent Cinema
 Kuessipan (TIE)
 ''Test Pattern'' (TIE)

Marlon Riggs Award
 Rita Moreno

References

External links
 Official website

2021 film awards
2021 in San Francisco
San Francisco Film Critics Circle Awards